Luis Oyarzún Peña was a Chilean writer and aesthetician. In his youth he studied law and philosophy at the University of Chile. Later he went to London to study aesthetics. Oyarzún was part of the Generation of '38. For his poetry collection Mediodía published in 1958 he received in 1959 the Premio Municipal de Poesía. In 1971 he moved to Valdivia where he was made professor in aesthetics in the Austral University of Chile. He died in 1972 as result of a massive hemorrhage.

Two posthumous original works of Oyarzún have been pusblished: Defensa de la tierra and Meditaciones estéticas.

References

1920 births
1972 deaths
People from Santa Cruz, Chile
Chilean non-fiction writers
20th-century Chilean male writers
Academic staff of the Austral University of Chile
Chilean male poets
20th-century Chilean poets